The Russian Catholic Apostolic Exarchate of Russia is the sui iuris Eastern Catholic jurisdiction of the Catholic Church for the Russian language Byzantine Rite in Russia. It is one of only two components of the dormant Russian Greek Catholic Church, which has no proper diocese, its only sister being the Russian Apostolic Exarchate of Harbin in China, which also has been vacant for decades.

History 
It was established in 1917 as an Apostolic exarchate, this being the Eastern Catholic pre-diocesan equivalent of an Apostolic vicariate; hence it was directly subject to the Apostolic See and its Congregation for the Eastern Churches and not part of any ecclesiastical province. It was established in territory that previously exclusively belonged to the Latin Metropolitan Roman Catholic Archdiocese of Mohilev.

Ordinaries 
It has been vacant since 1951, having had only two incumbents, both of which belonged to the Ukrainian Studite Monks (MSU), a Byzantine Rite monastic order of the Ukrainian Greek Catholic Church:
 Blessed Leontiy Leonid Feodorov, MSU (1917.05.28 – 1935.03.07)
 Blessed Klymentiy Sheptytsky, MSU (1939.09.17 – 1951.05.01); also first Hegumen of the Ukrainian Studite Monks (1919 – 1944.11), then Archimandrite of the Ukrainian Studite Monks (1944.11 – 1951.05.01)

See also 
 List of Catholic dioceses in Russia

References

External links 
 GCatholic

Apostolic exarchates
Eastern Catholicism in Russia
Eastern Catholic dioceses
1917 establishments in Russia
Religious organizations established in 1917
Dioceses established in the 20th century
Russian Greek Catholic Church

it:Esarcato apostolico di Russia